Mohamed Hardi (16 March 1943 – 4 May 1996) was the Algerian minister for the interior and local collectives in the 1992 government of Belaid Abdessalam.

See also
Cabinet of Algeria

References

1943 births
1996 deaths
Place of birth missing
Place of death missing
Interior ministers of Algeria
21st-century Algerian people